Breaking the Rules is a 1992 American drama film directed by Neal Israel, executive produced by Larry A. Thompson, starring Jason Bateman, C. Thomas Howell, Jonathan Silverman and Annie Potts.  Jason's father, Kent Bateman, has a role in the movie as well.

Plot
Phil (Jason Bateman) is a cancer-stricken man who tricks his two best friends, Gene (C. Thomas Howell) and Rob (Jonathan Silverman), whom he hasn't seen in a long time, to go on a road trip, by inviting them to a fake engagement party. This has the potential for problems because Gene once stole Rob's girlfriend. Phil gets them to be friends again. He tells them of his illness and all three decide to go to Los Angeles for Phil's dying wish: to be a contestant on Jeopardy! On the way there they meet an attractive wild woman with a heart of gold (Annie Potts).

Cast
 Jason Bateman as Phil Stepler
 Shawn Phelan as Young Phil Stepler
 C. Thomas Howell as Gene Michaels
 Jackey Vinson as Young Gene Michaels
 Jonathan Silverman as Rob Konigsberg
 Marty Belafsky as Young Rob Konigsberg 
 Annie Potts as Mary Klinglitch
 Kent Bateman as Mr. Stepler
 Krista Tesreau as Rob's Date
 Frank Welker as Special Vocal Effects
 Paul Cobb as distressed and snappily dressed funeral attendee
 Angelbertha Cobb as the mourning widow funeral attendee

Reception
Roger Ebert savaged the film in his contemporary review, damning its inauthentic script wherein "one appalling scene follows another". In an exasperated tone, he asked: "Was there no one to cry out, Stop this madness? No one to read the script and see that it was without sense or sensibility? No one to listen to the dialogue and observe that nobody in the world ever talked like this?"

References

External links

Films set in Cleveland
1992 films
1990s English-language films
1992 drama films
Films directed by Neal Israel
Films scored by David Kitay
American drama films
1990s American films